Jagoštica is a village located in the municipality of Bajina Bašta, western Serbia, as of 2011 census, it has a population of 77 inhabitants.

References

Populated places in Zlatibor District